Saraswathi Vidyalaya Senior Secondary School is located in Vadapalani, a suburb of Chennai, in the Indian state of Tamil Nadu. The school was inaugurated in 1956 by the Congress Leader and then  former Chief Minister of Tamil Nadu Thiru.K. Kamaraj. The Founder and Principal Mrs. K. Saraswathi received the Presidential award from the President R. Venkataraman. She also received the Silver Elephant award from President Dr. Shankar Dayal Sharma. 

The school enrolls children from kindergarten to Senior secondary level. It is affiliated to the CBSE Central Board of Secondary Education from Std I to XII. The medium of instruction at Saraswathi Vidyalaya is English language, and one other language from Hindi or Tamil language, is offered.

Branches
Saraswathi Vidyalaya Matriculation School, 150, Choolaimedu High Road, Choolaimedu, Chennai 600 094 
Saraswathi Vidyalaya Matriculation School, Enathur-Kanchipuram

References

External links
 Government of India - Department of Higher Education - List of recognized school boards
 Mr.Natarajan, Principal of Saraswathi Vidyalaya Boys Matriculation School, Chennai
 The 104th birth anniversary celebrations of K. Kamaraj, the former Chief Minister of Tamil Nadu.

Principal Mrs.K. Saraswathi along with J. Uma Maheswari Director of Elementary Education, Govt. of Tamilnadu

Primary schools in Tamil Nadu
High schools and secondary schools in Tamil Nadu
Private schools in Chennai
High schools and secondary schools in Chennai
Educational institutions established in 1956
1956 establishments in Madras State